Opende is a village in the north-eastern Netherlands, in the province of Groningen. It is part of the municipality of Westerkwartier. It had a population of around 2,865 in January 2017.

History 
The village was first mentioned in 1457 as vpeynde, and means "upper end" which refers to the border between Groningen and Friesland. Opende is a road village which developed in the Middle Ages in the moorland.

The Dutch Reformed church dates from 1748 and replaces a 1648 church. The front was renovated in 1915, and it was enlarged in 1930.

Opende was home to 369 people in 1840.

Gallery

References

External links 

Populated places in Groningen (province)
Westerkwartier (municipality)